is a Shinto shrine located in the Ichinomiya neighborhood of the city of Itoigawa, Niigata. It is one of the three shrines claiming the title of ichinomiya of former Echigo Province.  The main festivals of the shrine is held annually on April 10 and October 24.

Enshrined kami
The kami enshrined at Amatsu Jinja are:
 , known here as Amatsuhikohikoho Ninigi no mikoto; grandson of the sun goddess Amaterasu, and the great-grandfather of Emperor Jimmu.
 , ancestor of the Fujiwara clan
 , ancestor of the Imbe clan

History
Amatsu Jinja claims to have been founded during the reign of the semi-legendary Emperor Keikō (71 to 130 AD) in the Kofun period. Historical records state that Emperor Kōtoku (596-694 AD) had prayers said at this shrine, and its name appears in the Engishiki records compiled in 927 AD as the major shrine of ancient Kubiki County in Echigo, although it is by no means certain that the current Amatsu Shrine is actually the same shrine as is mentioned in these ancient records. In 1611, the Tokugawa shogunate awarded the shrine a stipend of 100 koku for its upkeep. After the Meiji restoration and the establishment of State Shinto, the shrine was originally designated as a "county shrine", but was later raised in status to that of a prefectural shrine (県社).  

The Heiden of the shrine is an irimoya-style 7 x 5 bay building with a thatch roof built in 1662. The Haiden is a gabled 3x2 bay structure with a copper roof built in 1797.

The Bugaku performances held during the shrine's annual festival on April 10-11 is a National  Important Intangible Folk Cultural Property.

The shrine is located  a ten-minute walk from Itoigawa Station.

Subsidiary shrine
The building is a one-bay structure with a Nagare-zukuri roof and was built in 1798.

Gallery

See also
 List of Shinto shrines in Japan
Ichinomiya

References

External links

Niigata Prefecture Kanko Navi 
Itoigawa tourist information 

Shinto shrines in Niigata Prefecture
Itoigawa, Niigata
Echigo Province
Ichinomiya